Livovská Huta is a village and municipality in Bardejov District in the Prešov Region of north-east Slovakia.

History
In historical records the village was first mentioned in 1773. The "huta" in its name refers to a glass factory that was once located there.

Geography
The municipality lies at an altitude of 640 meters (2,100 feet) and covers an area of 14.215 km² (5.5 miles2).
It is at the headwaters of the Topľa River.

References

External links
https://web.archive.org/web/20070427022352/http://www.statistics.sk/mosmis/eng/run.html

Villages and municipalities in Bardejov District
Šariš